First Miles is a compilation album by American jazz musician Miles Davis, released on July 12, 1990 by Savoy Records. The album includes tracks from Davis's first recording session, backing singer Rubberlegs Williams on April 24, 1945, and the first session produced under his name, leading the members of Charlie Parker's band on August 14, 1947.

Davis plays no solos in the session with Rubberlegs Williams, only being heard as part of an ensemble. He says in his autobiography he was so nervous on his first ever recording he could hardly play, and he forgot most of the details as he put the experience out of his mind.

Davis had already recorded several sessions by 1947 as a member of Parker's band for the Savoy and Dial labels, but whereas Parker usually recorded with no rehearsals, Davis had the group rehearse the material twice before recording. Davis wrote and arranged all four tracks, which were released as 78rpm singles under the name "Miles Davis All-Stars". The four tracks have also been compiled on numerous Charlie Parker Savoy compilations, including Bird: The Savoy Recordings (Master Takes) (SJL 2201). Davis' next recording session as leader would be the first of the Birth of the Cool sessions in 1949, after having left Parker's band.

Track listing 

Subsequent reissues often combined false start takes and reordered the Davis tracks first. A 2003 reissue CD contained bonus track "Now's The Time"

Original 78rpm Singles 
The master takes of the tracks on this album were originally issued on the following 78rpm singles:
 Savoy 564: Rubberlegs Williams – That's the Stuff You Gotta Watch / Pointless Mama Blues
 Savoy 5516: Rubberlegs Williams – Deep Sea Blues / Bring It On Home
 Savoy 934: Miles Davis All-Stars – Milestones / Sippin' at Bells
 Savoy 951: Fats Navarro & Leo Parker – Goin' to Minton's / Miles Davis & Charlie Parker – Half Nelson
 Savoy 977: Charlie Parker – Chasin' the Bird / Miles Davis All-Stars – Little Willie Leaps

Personnel

Milestones / Little Willie Leaps / Half Nelson / Sippin' at Bells
Miles Davis All-Stars, August 14, 1947, Harry Smith Studios, NYC
Miles Davis – trumpet
Charlie Parker – tenor sax
John Lewis – piano
Nelson Boyd – bass
Max Roach – drums

That's the Stuff You Gotta Watch / Pointless Mama Blues / Deep Sea Blues / Bring It On Home
Herbie Fields Band with Rubberlegs Williams, April 24, 1945, WOR Studios, NYC
Rubberlegs Williams – vocals
Miles Davis – trumpet
Herbie Fields – tenor sax, clarinet
Teddy Brannon – piano 
Leonard Gaskin – bass
Ed Nicholson – drums

Production
Teddy Reig – original producer
Phil Schaap – compilation producer, remastering assistant, liner notes
Jack Towers and Joe Brescio – remastering
Dick Smith – art director
William Gottlieb – cover photograph

References

1988 compilation albums
Albums produced by Phil Schaap
Miles Davis compilation albums
Savoy Records compilation albums
Albums produced by Teddy Reig